Odd Girl Out is a 2005 drama telefilm starring Alexa Vega, Lisa Vidal, Elizabeth Rice, Alicia Morton, Leah Pipes, Shari Dyon Perry, Joey Nappo, and Chad Biagini. First aired April 4, 2005 on Lifetime, the film is based on the book Odd Girl Out: The Hidden Culture of Aggression in Girls by Rachel Simmons. It sheds light onto the topic of school bullying among girls.

Plot
Vanessa Snyder (Alexa Vega) is a beautiful and intelligent eighth-grader who is best friends with queen bee Stacey Larson (Leah Pipes) and Nikki Rodriguez (Elizabeth Rice), who is secretly jealous of the bond between the two. Outside of the clique is the kindhearted Emily (Shari Dyon Perry), and the "wannabe" Tiffany Thompson (Alicia Morton), who desires to become part of the group. Vanessa's loving divorced mother Barbara (Lisa Vidal) is proud of her esteemed daughter.

One day, Nikki tricks Vanessa into getting close to Tony (Chad Biagini), a boy whom Stacey (and somewhat Vanessa) has a crush on. Vanessa is subsequently ostracized from the posse and Tiffany is allowed in, becoming Nikki's sidekick. Stacey pretends to still be Vanessa's friend, all the while enabling the abuse against her, including during gym class. The clique also creates a website called "Hating Vanessa" in which students post insulting content about her. Although Emily encourages Vanessa to not run back to the clique, she tries to make amends but is rebuffed. Vanessa hides in one of the bathroom stalls and the clique, knowing she is there, arrives in the bathroom and badmouths her. Vanessa becomes deeply depressed and later cuts most of her hair off and skips school, fearing being mocked for her new look. Barbara addresses the bullying with Stacey's mother Denise (Rhoda Griffis), who trivializes it.

When her mother confronts her for being truant, Vanessa shows Barbara printed-out insults that the girls have made about her online. Barbara goes to the school to address the situation to the principal Miss Jessup (Margo Moorer), who says that she cannot punish verbal abuse. Meanwhile, Stacey has made it appear that Vanessa copied her assignment when it was actually vice versa; it is resolved by the two girls and their mothers with Miss Jessup.

Vanessa's spirits are suddenly lifted when she is told that she is still invited to Stacey's birthday party and that it is being changed to the following night. She and Barbara arrive at a club, where the party supposedly is, but it turns out that Stacey lied, causing Vanessa to break down and attempt suicide by overdose. She is taken to the emergency room and subsequently treated. Emily accuses Stacey of nearly killing Vanessa and is the only one of her peers to visit her in the hospital and befriend her. Back at home, Barbara comes upon a group chat, where some students at the school taunt Vanessa and urge her to really kill herself. Barbara prints out the group chat's messages and Miss Jessup threatens to expel the students who made the comments.

Upon returning to school, Vanessa and Stacey reunite and chat online after the latter apologizes for everything. Stacey sends the chat to Nikki, who prints it out and derisively reads it with Tiffany's help to Vanessa in the crowded hallway after the graduation ceremony. Vanessa confronts Stacey in front of everyone, seeing right through her lies. Everyone applauds as a humiliated Stacey walks out of the school, disbanding the bullying clique. Barbara watches with pride as Vanessa and Emily hug and leave together for an after-party.

Cast
 Alexa Vega as Vanessa Snyder
 Lisa Vidal as Barbara Snyder
 Leah Pipes as Stacey Larson
 Elizabeth Rice as Nikki Rodriguez
 Shari Dyon Perry as Emily
 Alicia Morton as Tiffany Thompson
 Joey Nappo as Ezra
 Rhoda Griffis as Denise Larson
 Nancy McLoughlin as Ms. Donnely
 Margo Moorer as Miss Jessup
 Chad Biagini as Tony
 Micheal Arata as Dave Larson

Release
The film was released on DVD in 2006 by Lionsgate. On July 31, 2012, the film was re-released in a package of 4 Lifetime original movies on DVD titled Surviving High School.

References

External links
 
 

2005 films
2005 drama films
2005 television films
2000s English-language films
2000s teen drama films
American drama television films
American teen drama films
Films about school bullying
Films based on non-fiction books
Films directed by Tom McLoughlin
Films scored by Mark Snow
Films shot in New Orleans
Lifetime (TV network) films